GTPase-activator protein for Ras-like GTPase is a family of evolutionarily related proteins.

Ras proteins are membrane-associated molecular switches that bind GTP and GDP and slowly hydrolyze GTP to GDP. This intrinsic GTPase activity of ras is stimulated by a family of proteins collectively known as 'GAP' or GTPase-activating proteins. As it is the GTP bound form of ras which is active, these proteins are said to be down-regulators of ras.

The Ras GTPase-activating proteins are quite large (from 765 residues for sar1 to 3079 residues for IRA2) but share only a limited (about 250 residues) region of sequence similarity, referred to as the 'catalytic domain' or rasGAP domain.

Note: There are distinctly different GAPs for the rap and rho/rac subfamilies of ras-like proteins (reviewed in reference) that do not share sequence similarity with ras GAPs.

Examples 
Human genes encoding proteins containing this domain include:
 DAB2IP;
 GAPVD1;
 IQGAP1;    IQGAP2;    IQGAP3;
 NF1;
 RASA1;     RASA2;     RASA3;     RASA4;     RASAL1;    RASAL2;
 SYNGAP1;

References 

Protein domains
Protein families
Membrane proteins